The team competition was a modern pentathlon event held as part of the Modern pentathlon at the 1964 Summer Olympics programme.  The team scores were the sum of the three pentathletes' scores in the individual competition.

Medalists

Results

Sources

 

Modern pentathlon at the 1964 Summer Olympics